Coptocycla texana, the anacua tortoise beetle, is a species of tortoise beetle in the family Chrysomelidae. It is found in Central America and North America.

This monophagous beetle feeds entirely on the leaves of the anacua (Ehretia anacua).

References

Further reading

 
 

Cassidinae
Articles created by Qbugbot
Beetles described in 1933